The 1971 Houston Astros season was a season in American baseball. The team finished tied for fourth in the National League West with a record of 79–83, 11 games behind the San Francisco Giants.

The Astros played 75 games that were decided by a one run margin, which is an all-time MLB record. In those games, the team had a record of 32–43.

Offseason 
 January 13, 1971: Doug Konieczny was drafted by the Astros in the 1st round (4th pick) of the 1971 Major League Baseball draft Secondary Phase.

Regular season 
September 5, 1971: In a game against the Giants, J. R. Richard struck out 15 batters in his very first game, tying a Major League record first established by Karl Spooner.

Season standings

Record vs. opponents

Notable transactions 
 June 8, 1971: 1971 Major League Baseball draft
Paul Siebert was drafted by the Astros in the 3rd round.
Rich Troedson was drafted by the Astros in the 1st round (8th pick) of the Secondary Phase, but did not sign.

Roster

Player stats

Batting

Starters by position 
Note: Pos = Position; G = Games played; AB = At bats; H = Hits; Avg. = Batting average; HR = Home runs; RBI = Runs batted in

Other batters 
Note: G = Games played; AB = At bats; H = Hits; Avg. = Batting average; HR = Home runs; RBI = Runs batted in

Pitching

Starting pitchers 
Note: G = Games pitched; IP = Innings pitched; W = Wins; L = Losses; ERA = Earned run average; SO = Strikeouts

Other pitchers 
Note: G = Games pitched; IP = Innings pitched; W = Wins; L = Losses; ERA = Earned run average; SO = Strikeouts

Relief pitchers 
Note: G = Games pitched; W = Wins; L = Losses; SV = Saves; ERA = Earned run average; SO = Strikeouts

Farm system

References

External links
1971 Houston Astros season at Baseball Reference

Houston Astros seasons
Houston Astros season
Houston Astro